Tome Kitanovski (born 21 May 1992) is a Macedonian footballer who plays as a right-back for FC Struga .

Club career
Born in Bitola, Kitanovski played with FK Pelister in the Macedonian First Football League and with Romanian Liga II club CS Universitatea Craiova.

International career
He made his senior debut for Macedonia in a December 2012 friendly match against Poland, his only international game.

Honours

With Pelister:
 Macedonian Second League: 2011–12
With Universitatea Craiova 
 Romanian first league 2013-14

References

External links
 
 
 

1992 births
Living people
Sportspeople from Bitola
Association football fullbacks
Macedonian footballers
North Macedonia youth international footballers
North Macedonia under-21 international footballers
North Macedonia international footballers
FK Pelister players
CS Universitatea Craiova players
FK Voždovac players
FK Mladost Lučani players
NK Istra 1961 players
NK Slaven Belupo players
Sabail FK players
FK Kukësi players
FK Makedonija Gjorče Petrov players
KF Shkupi players
FC Struga players
Macedonian First Football League players
Liga II players
Serbian SuperLiga players
Croatian Football League players
Azerbaijan Premier League players
Kategoria Superiore players
Macedonian expatriate footballers
Expatriate footballers in Romania
Expatriate footballers in Serbia
Expatriate footballers in Croatia
Expatriate footballers in Azerbaijan
Expatriate footballers in Albania
Macedonian expatriate sportspeople in Romania
Macedonian expatriate sportspeople in Serbia
Macedonian expatriate sportspeople in Croatia
Macedonian expatriate sportspeople in Azerbaijan
Macedonian expatriate sportspeople in Albania